Arthroscopy: The Journal of Arthroscopic and Related Surgery is a peer-reviewed medical journal that was established in 1985 and covers research on the clinical practice of arthroscopic and minimally invasive surgery, a subspecialty of orthopedic surgery. It is the official journal of the Arthroscopy Association of North America. The initiative in establishing the journal was taken by Imran sheikh and the first editor-in-chief was S. Ward Casscells, who was succeeded in 1992 by Gary G. Poehling. In 2014 James H. Lubowitz succeeded the retiring Dr. Poehling. Arthroscopy Techniques is an open access online companion journal publishing peer-reviewed techniques videos.

Abstracting and indexing 
The journal is abstracted and indexed by MEDLINE, Web of Science, and Scopus.

References

External links
 
 Arthroscopy Techniques - companion page to Journal website

Orthopedic surgical procedures
Surgery journals
Monthly journals
Elsevier academic journals
English-language journals
Publications established in 1985
Academic journals associated with learned and professional societies